Sergio Villanueva may refer to:
Sergio Villanueva (footballer) (born 1975), Spanish footballer
Sergio Villanueva (boxer) (born 1988), Mexican boxer